Dominion Raceway is a motorsport complex currently operating in Thornburg, Virginia. The facility includes 4/10-mile oval track, a 2-mile road course, and a 1/8-mile drag strip. The track hosts NASCAR, SCCA, and Superkart events along with amateur road course and street racing events.

New location

The motorsport complex at the new location broke ground in 2013 and opened in 2016 at 6510 Dominion Raceway Ave. in Thornburg, Virginia.

Inaugural Winners

Inaugural Race Winners

Old Dominion Speedway
Old Dominion Speedway (ODS) was a motorsport complex located in Prince William County, just south of Manassas, Virginia. The complex closed in 2012.

The dragstrip hosted Friday night drag races and Wednesday evening Test and Tunes. Weekly divisions included: Super Pro, Foot Brake, Motorcycle, Quick 16, and Top Street 5.8. The drag strip, when first used in 1953, was originally a 1/8th-mile dirt track, and the first officially sanctioned drag strip on the East Coast.  The 3/8-mile track hosted Late Models, INEX Legends, Mini Modifieds, UCARSet Stocks, Bandoleros, and UCARS.  The track was built as a dirt track in 1952 and was paved in 1953.

Old Dominion was also the birthplace of the Late Model Stock Car, "The Late Model Sportsman and Limited Sportsman divisions, along with some support classes ran until 1979, when track promoter Dick Gore came up with an idea for a class that would become one of the fastest growing divisions in NASCAR. 'They said it would never work', says Gore, referring to the Late Model Stock Car division. But work it did as it became one of the most popular divisions, spreading throughout the country." and later became the NASCAR Xfinity Series.

Late Model Track Champions

1979: Billy Earl
1980–1982: Not held
1983: Charlie Ford
1984: Curtis Markham
1985: Curtis Markham
1986: Danny Fair
1987: Eddie Johnson
1988: Charlie Ford
1989: Charlie Ford
1990: Danny Fair
1991: Eddie Johnson

1992: Danny Fair
1993: Brandon Butler
1994: Danny Fair
1995: Charlie Ford
1996: Wes Troup
1997: Wes Troup
1998: Dale Delozier
1999: Dale Delozier
2000: Mark McFarland
2001: Dustin Storm
2002: Mike Darne

2003: Mark McFarland
2004: Brandon Butler
2005: Franklin Butler III
2006: Frank Deiny Jr.
2007: Michael Hardin
2008: Willard Lawrence
2009: Willard Lawrence
2010: Adam Brenner
2011: David Polenz
2012: Doug Liberman

Old Dominion Kart Series
The speedway also hosted a karting series. Divisions include Jr. Sportsman, Kid Kart, Bandelero, Senior Champ, Cadet, Stock Lite, Jr. Stock, and Jr. Champ. Ran by DJ Powell, Ryan, Joshua, and Jonathan Pritt and many more.

Special events
The track hosted monster trucks, a U.S. Drift sanctioned drifting event, and car shows. The Speedway also hosted six Virginia Sprint races and five Shenandoah Mini Cup Races. They also hosted a Rolling Thunder Modified Race. The premier event at Old Dominion was "The Big One" held at the end of the season. It sees the highest car counts, biggest purse, and more spectators than most events. It was a non-points race for the Late Models, allowing the drivers to go all out to win.

In 2010, the "Big One" was the final race of the season at ODS.  It was also the final race in the battle for the Virginia State Championship.  CE Falk entered the race, needing to win the race to win the Virginia Championship.  Despite leading early, he was not able to secure the victory paving the road for Justin Johnson to win the Championship.  Adam Brenner won the track championship with a solid finish and the race win went to Mike Darne.

In 2011, Dustin Storm led the most laps.  He had to charge through the field after changing a tire before he crossed the line.  After the fans filed out and the majority of the media left, Dustin Storm was disqualified and Doug Liberman was awarded the win.

In 2012, Michael Hardin won the race before a packed house in what would end up being the final race ever held at the Old Dominion Speedway oval.

"ODS The Big One" winners
2006: Dustin Storm
2007: Dustin Storm
2008: Not held
2009: David Polenz
2010: Mike Darne
2011: Doug Liberman
2012: Michael Hardin

Joe Gibbs Youth for Tomorrow 150 winners
2010: Mike Darne
2011: Mike Darne
2012: Dustin Storm

NASCAR history
The track was called Longview Speedway before the Gore family purchased it. The track hosted Grand National Series races in 1958 and from 1963 to 1966. Former racing greats such as Lee Petty, Richard Petty, Ralph Earnhardt, Ned Jarrett, Bobby Allison, Darrell Waltrip, and Lennie Pond, have raced at ODS. In recent years, Mark McFarland won several track championships and Denny Hamlin raced there. The current driver for the No. 88 Champion Spark Plugs Chevrolet Monte Carlo in the USAR Hooters Pro Cup Series, Richard Boswell also made his start at this track. Many other USAR Hooters Pro Cup Series drivers, such as Jack Bailey, Trevor Bayne, and Charlie Ford have also raced at ODS. In 2006, Albert Anderson became the first African-American to win a race at Old Dominion Speedway.

Winners
 1958: Frankie Schneider
 1963: Richard Petty
 1964: Ned Jarrett
 1964: Ned Jarrett
 1965: Junior Johnson
 1965: Richard Petty
 1966: Elmo Langley

References

External links
 

NASCAR tracks
Buildings and structures in Spotsylvania County, Virginia
Motorsport venues in Virginia
Drag racing venues
Tourist attractions in Spotsylvania County, Virginia
2016 establishments in Virginia
Sports venues completed in 2016
Road courses in the United States